Robert William RisCassi (born January 18, 1936) is a retired United States Army four-star general who served as Vice Chief of Staff of the United States Army (VCSA) from 1989 to 1990; Commander in Chief, United Nations Command/Commander in Chief, ROK/U.S. Combined Forces Command/Commander, U.S. Forces Korea/Commanding General, Eighth United States Army (CINCUNC/CINCCFC/COMUSFK/CG EUSA) from 1990 to 1992; and Commander in Chief, United Nations Command/Commander in Chief, ROK/U.S. Combined Forces Command/Commander, United States Forces Korea (CINCUNC/CINCCFC/COMUSFK) from 1992 to 1993.

Biography
RisCassi was born on January 18, 1936, in Hartford, Connecticut, and is a 1958 graduate of the University of Connecticut with a bachelor's degree in history and holds a master's degree from Auburn University in Political Science.

His other assignments include Director of the Joint Staff and Deputy Chief of Staff for Operations and Plans, all in Washington, D.C.; Deputy Commanding General of the United States Army Training and Doctrine Command and Commanding General of the Combined Arms Center at Fort Leavenworth, Kansas; Commander of the 9th Infantry Division (Motorized), Fort Lewis, Washington; Assistant Division Commander of the 8th Infantry Division (Mechanized) in Germany; and Assistant Commandant of the United States Army Infantry School at Fort Benning, Georgia. His military education includes the Army War College and the Air Command and Staff College. He was awarded the University of Connecticut Distinguished Alumni Award in 1989.

Awards and decorations

Post military
RisCassi is Vice-President of L-3 Communications Corporation. He served on the Commission on Roles and Missions in 1995, and has been employed as an executive with Loral Corporation and Lockheed Martin. He sits on the boards of Alliant Techsystems, Korea Society, National Intelligence Council, is a member of the SPECTRUM Group's Senior Advisory Group and was a member of the Department of Defense 2001 investigation into the No Gun Ri allegations, and sat on the National Defense Panel in 1997.

References

United States Army generals
United States Army personnel of the Vietnam War
Recipients of the Distinguished Service Medal (US Army)
Recipients of the Legion of Merit
Recipients of the Gallantry Cross (Vietnam)
University of Connecticut alumni
Auburn University alumni
1936 births
Living people
Military personnel from Hartford, Connecticut
United States Army Vice Chiefs of Staff
Commandants of the United States Army Command and General Staff College
Recipients of the Air Medal
Recipients of the Defense Distinguished Service Medal
Commanders, United States Forces Korea